The Big Breakfast is a Canadian television morning news and entertainment program. It aired on the A-Channel stations and CKX from 1997 to 2005. It has no relation to the UK show of the same name.

Each A-Channel station produced and broadcast its own Big Breakfast. CKX aired CHMI's Winnipeg edition. The anchors were Jon Ljungberg and Jimmy Mac in Winnipeg (CHMI), Mark Scholz, Steve Antle and Bridget Ryan in Edmonton (CKEM) and Dave Kelly and Tara McCool in Calgary (CKAL).

On December 1, 2004, CHUM Limited officially took over ownership of the A-Channel system, and the stations were re-launched as Citytv on August 2, 2005. The Big Breakfast was also relaunched as Breakfast Television, the name Citytv uses for its similar morning shows, on the same day the stations were rebranded. The A-Channel brand was subsequently transferred to CHUM's former NewNet stations, whose own morning programs were retitled A-Channel Morning.

References

1990s Canadian television news shows
2000s Canadian television news shows
1997 Canadian television series debuts
2005 Canadian television series endings
A-Channel original programming
English-language television shows
Television morning shows in Canada
Television shows filmed in Calgary
Television shows filmed in Edmonton
Television shows filmed in Winnipeg